General Sergei Ivanovich Mal'tsov (1810–1893) was a Russian industrialist of the nineteenth century.

His father, Ivan Akimovich Mal’tsov expanded the family business, previously based on glass and linen production by developing the metallurgy industry in Lyudinovo, Kaluga Oblast. From this basis Sergei developed the Mal’tsov industrial region an area which covered about 215,000 hectares mostly along the Bolva River. He turned the industrial region into a major centre of machine building. It was here that the first rails, locomotives, steamships, and screw propellers were  made in Russia. By 1875, Mal’tsov was able to found a corporation which included over 30 enterprises with a combined capital of 6 million rubles. These works were nationalised in 1885.

References

1810 births
1893 deaths
19th-century businesspeople from the Russian Empire
Russian businesspeople in metals